Sam LaPorta (born January 12, 2001) is an American football tight end for the Iowa Hawkeyes. He was named the Kwalick–Clark Tight End of the Year in 2022.

High school career
LaPorta attended Highland High School in Highland, Illinois. He played wide receiver and defensive back in high school. During his career he had 3,793 receiving yards and 50 touchdowns. LaPorta committed to the University of Iowa to play college football.

College career
As a true freshman at Iowa in 2019, LaPorta played in 12 games with two starts and had 15 receptions for 188 yards. As a sophomore in 2020, he started five of eight games, recording 27 receptions for 271 yards and one touchdown. He returned to Iowa as a starter in 2021, and hauled in 53 passes for 670 yards and 3 touchdowns.

References

External links
 Iowa profile

2001 births
Living people
American football tight ends
Iowa Hawkeyes football players
People from Highland, Illinois
Players of American football from Illinois